The Gen. Albert Gallatin Jenkins House — known historically (along with its 4,395 acre estate) as "Green Bottom" — is located on the east bank of the Ohio River about 7 miles north of Lesage, Cabell County, West Virginia.

The plantation house was built about 1835, and is a -story, rectangular, brick dwelling in a late period Federal style.  It sits on a sandstone foundation and the interior has a center hall, single pile plan.

The most prominent resident was Albert Gallatin Jenkins (1830-1864), a two-term member of the U.S. House of Representatives (1857–61), who then joined the Confederate States Army in the Civil War, attaining the rank of brigadier general before dying of wounds received in battle in 1864.

The house is open as a museum operated by the West Virginia Division of Culture and History. It was listed on the National Register of Historic Places in 1978.

References

External links
 Jenkins Plantation Museum

Historic house museums in West Virginia
Houses on the National Register of Historic Places in West Virginia
Federal architecture in West Virginia
Houses completed in 1835
Houses in Cabell County, West Virginia
National Register of Historic Places in Cabell County, West Virginia
Museums in Cabell County, West Virginia
Plantation houses in West Virginia